César Tiberio Jiménez (born July 4, 1969) is a Mexican racing driver. He is the son of Filiberto Jiménez and champion in several categories in Mexico (Formula Three, MasterCard Truck Series).

Family
He is the son of driver and promoter Filiberto Jiménez, who built the Autódromo Monterrey. His brother Gilberto and nephew Gilbo are also drivers.

Career

Tiberio debuted in Formula K at 17 years old. He won in Formula Three International on 1991 and 1992. In 1993 he ran in the Indy Lights, but did not have much success. He later ran in the Indy Lights Panamericana.

Promoter

He took the place of his father in promoting racing events in the Autódromo Monterrey, and built the Museo del Automovilismo Deportivo Regiomontano in Monterrey inaugurated on August 23, 2008.

Racing record

American Open Wheel
(key)

Indy Lights

References

Living people
1969 births
Sportspeople from Monterrey
Racing drivers from Nuevo León
NASCAR drivers
Indy Lights drivers
Mexican Formula Three Championship drivers